Iligan Computer Institute is a technical school in the Philippines. It has 3 campuses: ICI - Iligan, ICI - CDO, and ICI - Kapatagan. ICI - Iligan is located at Diocesan Centrum Bldg., Brgy. Poblacion, Iligan City. ICI - CDO is located at Del Monte Coop Building, Bugo, Cagayan de Oro. ICI - Kapatagan is located at Kapatagan, Lanao del Norte.

Iligan Computer Institute is founded on April 15, 1997, by its President, Mr. Ladislao C. Tabanao Jr.

External links
Iligan Computer Institute official website

Vocational education in the Philippines
Schools in Iligan